Caroline Wozniacki was the defending champion, and successfully defended her title, defeating Olga Govortsova in the final 6–2, 7–5.

Seeds

Draw

Finals

Top half

Bottom half

External links
Main Draw
Qualifying Draw

MPS Group Championships - Singles
Singles